Gasoline is a 2001 Italian crime film directed by Monica Stambrini. It is based on a novel by Elena Stancanelli.

Plot
A young lesbian couple, Stella and Lenni, go on the run after the accidental death of Lenni's mother.

Cast
 Maya Sansa as Stella
 Regina Orioli as Lenni
 Mariella Valentini as Eleonora's mother
 Luigi Maria Burruano as Padre Gabriele (priest)
 Chiara Conti as Pippi
 Marco Quaglia as Sandro
 Pietro Ragusa as Filippo

Reception
Gasoline was nominated for the Prize of the City of Torino at the 2001 Torino International Festival of Young Cinema and the Outstanding Film award at the 2004 GLAAD Media Awards.

Kevin Thomas, writing for the Los Angeles Times praised the lead actors but said the film was "too derivative and sensational for its own sake to work."

References

External links
 
 

2001 films
2001 crime thriller films
2000s chase films
Films based on Italian novels
2000s Italian-language films
Italian LGBT-related films
Lesbian-related films
Italian crime thriller films